Skumsrud Heritage Farm is a Norwegian immigrant homestead located  west of Coon Valley, in Vernon County, Wisconsin, United States.

Description
It has 11 restored Norwegian pioneer log buildings, each of which represents a different architectural floor plan of the immigrant Norwegian pioneers.

History
Skumsrud Heritage Farm was built in 1853 by Nels Skumsrud. It was donated to Norskedalen in 1983 by his grandchildren, Lloyd and Ruth Thrune. The brother and sister wished to see the property preserved and also to see it serve as a means of educating people of the area's Norwegian heritage. The property is considered the oldest surviving house in the area, and was listed on the National Register of Historic Places in 1990.

References

External links
Southwest Museums in Wisconsin
Norskedalen
 Skumsrud Heritage Farm

Norwegian-American culture in Wisconsin
Museums in Vernon County, Wisconsin
Open-air museums in Wisconsin
Farms on the National Register of Historic Places in Wisconsin
Ethnic museums in Wisconsin
Farm museums in Wisconsin
Norwegian migration to North America
Norwegian-American museums
National Register of Historic Places in Vernon County, Wisconsin